John Beaver House, also known as the Thomas Shirley House, is a historic home located near Salem, Page County, Virginia. It was built in 1825–1826, and is a two-story, four bay, single pile brick dwelling. It has two entryways, a three-course molded brick cornice under the eaves of the gable roof, and exterior end chimneys. A two-story, five-bay kitchen/dining room ell was added in the late-19th century.

It was listed on the National Register of Historic Places in 1979.

Description
The home is set among the rolling farmlands of Massanutten Old Fields near the Shenandoah River in Page County. The original section was erected in 1825-6 by John Beaver; the ell was added in the late 19th century.
The original portion of the structure is a two-story, four-bay, single-pile building built of brick laid in Flemish bond on the facade, with five-course American bond on the ends. A three-course molded brick cornice embellishes the eaves of the gable roof and exterior end chimneys flank the ends of the house. The facade is symmetrical with a pair of front doors flanked by 9/6 windows in the first story and with four 6/6 windows in the floor. All of the facade windows are embellished with gauged jack arches. In the center between the two pairs of openings is a tall diaper pattern formed of glazed headers.

References

Houses on the National Register of Historic Places in Virginia
Houses completed in 1826
Houses in Page County, Virginia
National Register of Historic Places in Page County, Virginia
1826 establishments in Virginia